Trumbull Center is a section or neighborhood of the town of Trumbull in Fairfield County, Connecticut in New England. It is considered the center of the town, and was the seat of town government from 1883 through 1957. The Pequonnock River flows through the center in an easterly direction. The main thoroughfare is Connecticut Route 127 (aka Church Hill Road & White Plains Road).

The area was listed as a census-designated place (CDP) prior to the 2020 census.

Commerce
The center contains a class B-C retail area featuring banks, coffee shops, gas stations, professional services, and restaurants, mostly within the central located Trumbull Shopping Center.

Notable locations
 The Helen Plumb Building at 571 Church Hill Road was Trumbull's former town hall from 1883 through 1957.
 Riverside Cemetery. A cemetery dating back to the American revolution. It is also a site of the CT freedom trail as a prominent abolitionist Nero Hawley was buried here.
Twin Brooks Park 
Peqounock River Valley State Park 
Beach Memorial Park

Public safety
The neighborhood is patrolled by the Trumbull Police Department.

Fire safety for the neighborhood is provided by the Trumbull Center Fire Department. Two firehouses, one on White Plains Road and one at the top of Daniels Farm Road.

Transportation
The main thoroughfare is Connecticut Route 127 (Church Hill Road & White Plains Road), which is accessible via Connecticut Route 15, Connecticut Route 25 or Daniel's Farm Road.

The Pequonnock River bike lane and trail network system is an alternative and efficient method for walkers and cyclists to navigate to the Center quickly.

Bus service is provided by Greater Bridgeport Transit Authority's route 19X with multiple stops.

References 

Trumbull, Connecticut
Neighborhoods in Connecticut
Geography of Fairfield County, Connecticut
Populated places in Fairfield County, Connecticut
Census-designated places in Fairfield County, Connecticut
Census-designated places in Connecticut